The Ministry of Parliamentary Affairs is a ministry of the Government of South Sudan. The incumbent minister is Michael Makuei Lueth.

List of Ministers of Parliamentary Affairs

References

Parliamentary Affairs
South Sudan, Parliamentary Affairs
Parliamentary affairs ministries